("The Blackbird") is a chamber work by the French composer Olivier Messiaen for flute and piano. It was written and first performed in 1952 and is the composer's shortest independently published work, lasting just over five minutes.  It has neither time signature nor key signature. The composition originated in a commission for a test piece for flute for the Paris Conservatoire, at which Messiaen was a professor. The winners of the premier prix in the  that year were Daniel Morlier, Jean Pierre Eustache, Jean Ornetti, Régis Calle and the British flute player Alexander Murray. Messiaen had a consuming, lifelong interest in ornithology and particularly bird songs.  While not his first work to incorporate stylised birdsong,  was the earliest of his pieces to be based mainly on birdsong, and it foreshadows Messiaen's later, more extended birdsong-inspired pieces.

References

Notes

1952 compositions
Chamber music compositions
Compositions by Olivier Messiaen
Compositions for flute